Secalin is a prolamin glycoprotein found in the grain rye, Secale cereale.

Secalin is one of the forms of gluten proteins that people with coeliac disease cannot tolerate, and thus rye should be avoided by people with this disease. It is generally recommended that such people follow a gluten free diet.

In bread making with rye flour, this protein requires exposure to an acid such as lactic acid to make the bread rise. This is usually achieved with a sourdough ferment.

References 

S
S
Glycoproteins
Rye